Frohen-sur-Authie (literally Frohen on Authie) is a commune in the Somme department in Hauts-de-France in northern France.

Geography

History
The commune was created on the January 1, 2007 by the joining of the two old communes of Frohen-le-Grand and Frohen-le-Petit.

See also
Communes of the Somme department

References

Communes of Somme (department)
Populated places established in 2007